Deh-e Mord Sara (also Romanized as Deh-e Mord Sarā; also known as Dah Mard Sarā-ye Māshak, Deh-e Mardomsarā, Deh-e Mordeh Sarā, and Deh-e Mord Sarā-ye Māshak) is a village in Jirhandeh-ye Lasht-e Nesha Rural District, Lasht-e Nesha District, Rasht County, Gilan Province, Iran. At the 2006 census, its population was 126, in 34 families.

References 

Populated places in Rasht County